Kraken 18 was a day racing trimaran sailboat designed by Lock Crowther in the wake of his successful Bunyip 20 design, as a scaled-down version of the earlier Kraken 25 with similar performance. Its smaller size and folding beams made it more practical and led to its greater success.

Advertised as "a slightly faster, more attractive version of the Bunyip 20 with round bilge hulls", it shared an identical rig with the Bunyip 20 but was  shorter.

It was accepted as a class by the Victoria branch of Trimaran Association of Australia, making it the first one design trimaran class in Australian history.

See also
List of multihulls
Kraken 25
Kraken 33
Kraken 40
Lock Crowther
Trimaran Yacht Club of Victoria

References

Trimarans
Boats designed by Lock Crowther